This is a list of all United States Supreme Court cases from volume 468 of the United States Reports:

External links

1984 in United States case law